Limavady Junction railway station served the town of Limavady in County Londonderry in Northern Ireland.

The Londonderry and Coleraine Railway opened the station as Newton Junction on 1 March 1855. It was renamed Limavady Junction on 1 October 1875. At this time, new station buildings were provided to designs by the architect John Lanyon.

It closed on 17 October 1976.
Since 2013, the remains of the station have been demolished.

Routes

References

Disused railway stations in County Londonderry
Railway stations opened in 1855
Railway stations closed in 1976
1855 establishments in Ireland
Railway stations in Northern Ireland opened in the 19th century